Ribaševina (Serbian Cyrillic: Рибашевина) is a village located in the Užice municipality of Serbia. Royal Prime-minister Milan Stojadinovic was kept under house arrest in Ribasevina in 1939, before he was transferred to Mauritius. He was detained in Ribasevina in a villa of a famous Serbian and Yugoslavian painter and sculptor Mihailo Milovanovic. 

Užice
Populated places in Zlatibor District